Dichlorophenylphosphine is an organophosphorus compound with the formula C6H5PCl2.  This colourless viscous liquid is commonly used in the synthesis of organophosphines.

Dichlorophenylphosphine is commercially available. It may be prepared by an electrophilic substitution of benzene by phosphorus trichloride, catalyzed by aluminium chloride. The compound is an intermediate for the synthesis of other chemicals for instance dimethylphenylphosphine:
C6H5PCl2 + 2 CH3MgI → C6H5P(CH3)2 + 2 MgICl
Many tertiary phosphines can be prepared by this route.

In the McCormack reaction dichlorophenylphosphine adds dienes to give the chlorophospholenium ring.

Reductive coupling of the dichlorophosphine gives the cyclophosphine (PhP)5.

References

Phosphines